Guy II  may refer to:

Guy II de Balliol (died early 1160s)
Guy II, Count of Blois (died 1397)
 Guy II of Gibelet, of the Embriaco family
Guy II, Marquis of Namur (1312–1336)
Guy II, Count of Ponthieu (c. 1120–1147)
Guy II de la Roche (1280–1308)
Guy II de Nesle (died 1352), Lord of Mello
Guy II of Spoleto (died 882 or 883)